A/S Palladium was a Danish film production company which existed from 1919 to 2017.

History
Palladium was founded in Sweden in 1919 but was after a few years acquired by Svend Nielsen and Lau Lauritzen. The company produced its last film in 1976 and was dissolved in 2017.

Filmography
 Evas Forlovelse (1920)
 Landliggeridyl - Vandgang (1921)
 Tyvepak (1921)
 Opfinderen Ellehammer viser paa Lundtofte Flyveplads for førete Gang i Verden Flyvning paa Petroleum med nye Patroleumskarburator (1921)
 Harestegen (1921)
 Juleskibets Afrejse. Frederik VIII (1921)
 Københavns Havn og Frigavnen (1922)
 Sol, sommer og studiner (1922)
 Studentergaardens Indvielse 2. Februar 1922 (1922)
 Jubilæumsdyrskuet i Horsens 13-16. Juli 1922 (1922)
 Industrifilm (1923)
 World Cinema inviterer Publikum paa en flyvetur (1923)
 Kan Kærlighed kureres? (1923)
 Danske Folk i danske Klæder (1923)
 Med Palladiums Fotograf paa Udflugt til U.S.A. (1923)
 Vore venners vinter (1923)
 Livets karneval (1923)
 Lille Lise let-paa-taa (1923)
 Professor Petersens Plejebørn (1924)
 Kongens Isbaadssejlads (1924)
 Frederik VIII's Lystrejse til Middlelhavet (1924)
 Takt, tone og tosser (1925)
 Det daglige Brød (1925)
 Muldyr (1925)
 Øresundsugen (1925)
 Du skal ære din hustru (1925)
 Med 'Hans Egede' til Grønland (1925)
 Grønkøbings glade gavtyve (1925)
 Københavns Sherlock Holmes (1925)
 Udenfor Filmatelieret (1926)
 Dødsbokseren (1926)
 Ulvejægerne (1926)
 Børnehjælpsdagen i Odense (1926)
 Vore Damers Skønhedskonkurrence i Helsingør, 1.8.1926 (1926)
 Thorøfilmen (1926)
 Don Quixote (1926)
 Vester Vov-Vov (1927)
 Ping paa Palladium (1927)
 Tordenstenene (1927)
 Det belgiske Kongebesøg (1928)
 Børnehjælpsdagen i Odense (1928)
 Sommerfest i Ballerup (1928)
 Sommerfest i Køge (1928)
 Kongen af Pelikanien (1928)
 Pas paa pigerne (1930)
 Krudt med knald (1931)
 7-9-13 (1934)
 Ud i den kolde sne (1934)
 Week-end (1935)
 Snushanerne (1936)
 Panserbasse (1936)
 Giftes - nej tak! (1936)
 Plat eller krone (1937)
 I de gode, gamle dage (1940)
 Sommerglæder (1940)
 Tag det som en mand (1941)
 Tante Cramers testamente (1941)
 Wienerbarnet (1941)
 Peter Andersen (1941)
 Tobiasnætter (1941)
 Regnen holdt op (1942)
 Et skud før midnat (1942)
 Ta' briller på (1942)
 Vi kunde ha' det saa rart (1942)
 Naar bønder elsker (1942)
 De tre skolekammerater (1944)
 Otte akkorder (1944)
 Fyrtøjet (1946)
 Vandet på landet (1946)
 Brevet fra afdøde (1946)
 De gamle (1947)
 Calle og Palle (1948)
 Den stjaalne minister (1949)
 Smedestræde 4 (1950)
 Vores fjerde far (1951)
 Sukceskomponisten (1954)
 Ordet (1955)
 Flugten til Danmark (1955)
 Tante Tut fra Paris (1956)
 Tre må man være (1959)
 Pigen i søgelyset (1959)
 Det tossede paradis (1962)
 Oskar (1962)
 Vi har det jo dejligt (1963)
 Selvmordsskolen (1964)
 Slottet (1964)
 Gertrud (1964)
 Sytten (1965)
 Soyas tagsten (1966)
 Sangen om den røde rubin (1970)
 Hvorfor gør de det? (1971)
 Tandlæge på sengekanten (1971)
 Rektor på sengekanten (1972)
 Motorvej på sengekanten (1972)
 Hopla på sengekanten (1976)

References

External links

 Paladium at IMDV
 Source
 Source

Film production companies of Denmark
Defunct film and television production companies of Denmark
Danish companies established in 1919
2017 disestablishments in Denmark